The Berliner Theatertreffen (Theatertreffen : neologism literally meaning "theatre encounter" or "theatre meeting"
) is a two-week long theatre festival occurring yearly in May in Berlin, Germany.  It is a product of the Berliner Festspiele corporation, funded by the Federal Cultural Foundation (Kulturstiftung des Bundes) of Germany.

During the festival, those ten theatre pieces within the German-speaking realm that have premiered in the previous season and have been voted most noteworthy by the festival jury of seven drama critics are presented on various stages in Berlin.

Other festival events have come to include award ceremonies, Q&A and panel discussions, films and concerts.

The central building of the Berliner Festspiele corporation, known as the Haus der Berliner Festspiele, is on Schaperstraße 24, 10719 Berlin.

References

External links
 

Theatre festivals in Berlin
Spring (season) events in Germany
1964 establishments in Germany
Festivals established in 1964